Hunter Synagogue is a historic Jewish synagogue on Main Street in Hunter, Greene County, New York.  It was constructed between 1909 and 1914 and is a -story, three-by-seven-bay, Queen Anne–inspired building.  Also on the property is a shed built about 1910.

It was added to the National Register of Historic Places in 1999.

References

Synagogues in Upstate New York
Synagogues on the National Register of Historic Places in New York City
Queen Anne architecture in New York (state)
Queen Anne style synagogues
Buildings and structures in Greene County, New York
National Register of Historic Places in Greene County, New York